Nova Mutum is a municipality in the state of Mato Grosso in the Central-West Region of Brazil.
Its population was estimated in 2020 by the Brazilian Institute of Geography and Statistics as 46,813 people.

The city has the MT: 3rd best (HDI) of the state, and the 8th-largest economy, with a GDP of R$2167526.000000 MT: 8 BR: 332. The magazine Isto É and Austin Rating pointed out that Nova Mutum is the 8th city of Brazil in the ranking of economic indicators, item "foreign trade", and placed 28th in the social indicator item "health" among the best municipalities in Brazil with population up to 50 thousand inhabitants.

History 
Before being colonized, the region was known as "Irmandade" ("Brotherhood") and belonged to Jorge Rachid Jaudy. The project was finally implemented in 1981.

As the area was too big, there was the idea of creating opportunities for new pioneers, being developed as experiments with rice, corn and soybeans in 1974. Nova Mutum displaced for the first time the state Paraná in soybean production, won the title of Soy Capital.

The company then planned  to colonization, with the onset of fever of conquest of the Midwest and the last agricultural frontier of the country; the colonizing soon built in the early 10 houses and the matrix of colonizing an open village provisionally by tractor running machine. Then came a school and a community center, a health post, a shelter to house the buyers of land, and a hydroelectric plant for the initial energy. A basic infrastructure was built so the essentials could work. For the urban center were reserved . Those who acquired a rural lot received two urban land. As the building infrastructure did not work on its own, people were hired to manage this basic infrastructure.

So came the first doctor, Dr. Kazan and the first nurse, Doroti Chagas. Primitivo Cury placed the first market, later sold to Mr. Francisco Saito, in the same place of the current Saito Supermarket. The first bus station operated in the community center rented by Reinaldo Baldissera, and the first grocery store was owned by Roberto Faccio.
Not all batch buyers took them immediately. It was arriving according to its possibilities and correct in the sale of its possessions in the south of the country. All of the first inhabitants of the region came from Rio Grande do Sul and Santa Catarina, being practically all smallholders in the western two states.

Until early 2000, the city was predominantly southern, but with the release of the wonder of monoculture people from various regions of the country migrated to the city, especially after the arrival of multinational companies.

Economy 
The main sources of the economy are agriculture, with a focus on soy, corn and cotton production, as well as refrigerators and industries, such as soybean crushing, biodiesel and corn processing. Despite having an essentially primary economy, there are also investments in the transformation of the raw materials into products. In terms of production,  Nova Mutum is the 5th-largest of Mato Grosso and 9th in Brazil, with R$1.394 billion (+2.8%).

Nova Mutum is cut by the BR-163 highway, the main route of flow of crops in Mato Grosso; the granting of the BR-163 MT foresees investments of R$5.5 billion over 30 years, and R$2.8 billion invested in the first five years. This is the value estimated by the concessionaire West Route to perform duplication, recovery, conservation, maintenance, implementation of improvements, operations services and care to users.

Its installed capacity to slaughter 3000 animals/day, about 350 animals/h. the industrial sector with capacity to produce 100 tons/day, is divided into fresh pork, cooked and seasoned products. Melina Juices Melina grape juice is the first "grape juice 100% natural" produced in Mato Grosso and the third of Brazil; in 2011 won the label "Carrefour Guarantee of Origin".

In 2013, the gross domestic product of the municipality was R$2,167,526 thousand reais; the municipality is the third-largest exporter in the state and has as its main market overseas Asian countries, plus the European continent and part of the Middle East.

Nova Mutum is part of the 10 municipalities that are responsible for 48.06% of everything that is exported by the state, with $559.1 million.

Infrastructure 
Nova Mutum is considered a model in terms of infrastructure; the city has a master plan project that will keep the development organized for the next 30 years to grow in an orderly and projected way, a project to implement a technology park.

The municipality has  of bike paths, another 14 km are expected in the next years, with the aim of providing a better quality of life, through the practice of sports activities such as running, cycling and walking trails.

The city is served by Brig. Eduardo Gomes Airport.

Education 
Nova Mutum is a regional industrial qualification center; the municipality has a Senai unit that offers more than four thousand places in professional education courses in the areas of Food and Beverage, Construction, Management, Health, Safety at Work, Information Technology and Automotive.

Besides Nova Mutum, they are also attended from the municipalities: Alto Paraguay, Arenápolis, Diamantino, Nortelândia, Nova Maryland, Nova Maringa, Santa Rita do Trivelato, St. Alphonsus and Sao Jose do Rio Claro. The unit is the most modern and sustainable in the State, being a reference point in architecture, design and sustainability, with a total area of  that includes computer labs, microcomputer maintenance, cutting and sewing, baking, electrical and automation, maintenance, mechanical and machine shop. It has 20 classrooms, a library, environment for mobile actions, auditorium, canteen and cafeteria.

The city has a campus of the State University of Mato Grosso (UNEMAT), which provides the management courses, accounting and agronomy. Nova Mutum is a reference base in education with state and municipal schools of high standard, with swimming pool, swimming lessons, ballet, judo and food planned by nutritionists. Its mark on Ideb 2015 is 5.8.

Population

The population of Nova Mutum increased 113.47% over a period of 10 years, and was the city that had the highest population increase of Mato Grosso (in the period 2000–2010). The information is based on the results of the 2010 Demographic Census, conducted by the Brazilian Institute of Geography and Statistics (IBGE). In 2010, there were 31,649 inhabitants, and in 2000, the municipality had 14,818 inhabitants. To estimate the Brazilian Institute of Geography and Statistics (IBGE), Nova Mutum for 2016 had a population of 41,178, and is controversial due to the increase of more than 11.36% per year. Currently, Nova Mutum must have a population of 50,000.

The population explosion of Nova Mutum occurred when the municipality managed to reconcile agricultural production with industrialization, a fact that motivated the installation of hundreds of companies. The base of economy is based on the crops of soy, corn and cotton.

Currently, the city also has the 3rd Human Development Index and the second state of the interior, by rank. Nova Mutum reached 0758 in the category development, the sequence appears IDHM income as 0773, IDHM Longevity 0837, and Education 0673.

Geography
Geographical boundaries: North: Nova Maringá, Tapurah and Lucas do Rio Verde;
East: Sorriso and Santa Rita do Trivelato;
South: Rosário Oeste, Nobres and Diamantino;
West: São José do Rio Claro and Diamantino.

Distances: To the state capital (Cuiabá): . By the port of Santos: . By the port of Paranaguá:  to Santarém / PA: 1,530 km by BR163, to Alto Taquari / MT – railroad station (Ferronorte): 

Predominant Climate: Equatorial – Hot Tropical and sub-humid, with two well-defined seasons: Drought May–September; Rains: October–April

Altitudes: municipal office: ; Production area: .

Typography: The relief of Nova Mutum is characterized by being flat, with slope not greater than 3% and constitutes part of the Chapada dos Parecis.

Training Geological: Archaeology unfolded the Phanerozoic. Quaternary Basin of the Xingu and Mesozoic Basin of the Parecis.

Soil: The soil is predominantly latosol (80%) and quartz sand (20%).

Vegetation: The vegetation of the municipality is constituted by 70% and 30% of cerrado forest.

Water Resources: The municipality of Nova Mutum is located in the Amazon Basin. The main rivers are: Rio Verde, Rio Arinos, Rio Ranchão, Rio Novo, Rio Beija-Flor, Rio dos Patos, Rio Moderno and Rio Piuvão.

Territory of the municipality: , equivalent to 1.12% of the total area of the state of Mato Grosso.

Climate
Nova Mutum has a typical Mato Grosso tropical savanna climate (Köppen Aw). It has two seasons: a wet season from October to April and a dry season from May to September, whilst afternoon temperatures are consistently very warm to hot, and morning temperatures mild to warm. Especially during the wet season, high humidity can make it feel much hotter than suggested by the air temperature.

See also
List of municipalities in Mato Grosso

References

Municipalities in Mato Grosso